Mauritian diaspora in the United Kingdom are British people with Mauritian descent, or who were born in Mauritius. The 2001 UK Census recorded 27,078 Mauritian-born people living in the UK. The 2011 UK Census recorded 40,890 Mauritian-born residents in England, 434 in Wales, 571 in Scotland, and 83 in Northern Ireland. The Office for National Statistics estimates that in 2014, 41,000 people born in Mauritius were resident in the UK.

Up until 1968, Mauritius was under British rule, and the nation remains very closely linked to the UK, hence the UK being a popular destination for Mauritian emigrants.

Notable individuals

 Lise de Baissac, heroine of the Special Operations Executive during World War II
 Jean-Paul 'Bluey' Maunick, musician (Incognito)
 Safia Minney, founder of Fair Trade and environmental fashion and lifestyle label People Tree
 Rav Wilding, television presenter and police officer
 Bernard Paul, boxer of the 1990s and 2000s
 Julian Peedle-Calloo, TV Presenter
 Shelina Permalloo, English cook, author and winner of the MasterChef 2012 UK TV show competition
 Jackie Carter, singer and member of the 1970s Silver Convention
 Francoise Pascal actress 
 Gavin Ramjaun TV presenter and journalist
 Naga Munchetty TV presenter, newscaster and journalist
 Suella Braverman Attorney General, Member of Parliament, Barrister.
 Tommy Fury Professional Boxer, reality television contestant.
 Liberty Barros World's Most Flexible Girl, reality television contestant.

References

External links
 BBC Born Abroad - Other South and East Africa

 

African diaspora in the United Kingdom
United Kingdom
 
Immigration to the United Kingdom by country of origin